, provisionally designated , is a trans-Neptunian object residing in the outer Kuiper belt. It was discovered on October 22, 2014, by the Mount Lemmon Survey. 

It is approximately the size of 2 Pallas in the asteroid belt. On August 18, 2015,  was found to have been discovered over four years previously, with the designation . This extended its observation arc to over 4 years, and then precovery observations were found using the Sloan Digital Sky Survey from 2009.

See also
List of trans-Neptunian objects

References

External links 
 

Classical Kuiper belt objects
Discoveries by MLS
Possible dwarf planets
20141022